Aleksejs Jurjevs (12 October 1909 – October 1985) was a Latvian cyclist. He competed in the individual and team road race events at the 1936 Summer Olympics.

References

External links
 

1909 births
1985 deaths
Latvian male cyclists
Olympic cyclists of Latvia
Cyclists at the 1936 Summer Olympics
Sportspeople from Riga